The Carmelo K. Anthony Basketball Center is a college basketball practice facility located in Syracuse, New York.  The facility opened September 24, 2009.  Both the men's and women's basketball teams for Syracuse University use the center.  The facility houses two practice courts, locker rooms and office facilities for the men's and women's basketball programs at Syracuse. It is located on the north side of Manley Field House, in between the Roy Simmons Sr. Coaches Wing and the Comstock Art Facility.

The name comes from NBA star forward Carmelo Anthony, who donated $3 million to the project.  Anthony played one year with the Orange, the 2002-2003 season, in which he helped the program win its only NCAA Championship.

References
 Carmelo K. Anthony Basketball Center Information on SUAthletics.com

Sports venues in Syracuse, New York
College basketball practice facilities in the United States
Indoor arenas in New York (state)
Syracuse Orange basketball venues
2009 establishments in New York (state)
Sports venues completed in 2009
Basketball venues in New York (state)